Anne Brochet (born 22 November 1966) is a French actress.

Career
Brochet has appeared in films such as Cyrano de Bergerac, Le temps des porte-plumes, 30 ans, Une journée de merde! and Tous les matins du monde. She has also appeared in several episodes of the television show Voici venir l'orage.... Brochet won a César Award in the Best Supporting Actress category for her work in Tous les matins du monde.

Private life
Brochet lived with actor Gad Elmaleh from 1998 to 2002. They had one son, Noé.

Brochet has also published four novels.

Filmography

References

External links

1966 births
Living people
French film actresses
French comedians
Best Supporting Actress César Award winners
French women comedians
People from Amiens
French television actresses
20th-century French actresses
21st-century French actresses
Cours Florent alumni